Guram Tushishvili (born 5 February 1995) is a Georgian judoka. He won a gold medal at the 2018 World Judo Championships in men's +100 kg event. Tushishvili also won a gold medal in 2017 European Judo Championships in men's +100 kg event. On 29 March 2019 International Judo Federation disqualified before 29 May 2019. In 2020, he won one of the bronze medals in the men's +100 kg event at the 2020 European Judo Championships held in Prague, Czech Republic.

In 2021, he competed in the men's +100 kg event at the 2021 Judo World Masters held in Doha, Qatar.

He won the gold medal in his event at the 2022 Judo Grand Slam Tel Aviv held in Tel Aviv, Israel.

Medals
2017
 Grand Slam, Baku
 World Masters, St. Petersburg
2018
 Grand Prix, Tbilisi
 Grand Prix, Zagreb
 World Masters, Guangzhou

References

External links
 
 
 

1995 births
Male judoka from Georgia (country)
Living people
World judo champions
Judoka at the 2019 European Games
European Games gold medalists for Georgia (country)
European Games medalists in judo
Judoka at the 2020 Summer Olympics
Medalists at the 2020 Summer Olympics
Olympic medalists in judo
Olympic silver medalists for Georgia (country)
Olympic judoka of Georgia (country)
21st-century people from Georgia (country)